La guerra de los pasteles is a 1944 Mexican musical comedy film directed by Emilio Gómez Muriel. It stars Mapy Cortés, Domingo Soler, and Pedro Armendáriz.

References

External links
 

1944 films
1944 musical comedy films
Mexican black-and-white films
Mexican musical comedy films
1940s Mexican films